Louis John Menges (October 30, 1888 – March 10, 1969) was an American politician, businessman, and amateur soccer player who competed in the 1904 Summer Olympics.

Menges was born in East St. Louis, Illinois and went to the East St. Louis parochial and public schools. In 1904 he was a member of the Christian Brothers College team, which won the silver medal in the soccer tournament. He played all four matches as a goalkeeper. He served in the United States Army during World War I. Menges served in the Illinois Senate from 1935 to 1943 and was a Democrat. He was the owner and builder of movie theaters.

References

1888 births
1969 deaths
Sportspeople from East St. Louis, Illinois
Businesspeople from Illinois
Military personnel from Illinois
American soccer players
Footballers at the 1904 Summer Olympics
Olympic silver medalists for the United States in soccer
Democratic Party Illinois state senators
United States Army personnel of World War I
Soccer players from Illinois
20th-century American politicians
Medalists at the 1904 Summer Olympics
Association football goalkeepers
Christian Brothers Cadets men's soccer players
20th-century American businesspeople